Anthony Frederick Richardson (5 November 1943 – 29 August 2007) was an English professional footballer who played as a centre forward.

Career
Born in Alford, Richardson spent his early career with Nottingham Forest and Cheltenham Town. He joined Bradford City in May 1962, making 2 league appearances for the club, before moving to Ramsgate Athletic in February 1963.

Sources

References

1943 births
2007 deaths
People from Alford, Lincolnshire
English footballers
Association football forwards
Nottingham Forest F.C. players
Cheltenham Town F.C. players
Bradford City A.F.C. players
Ramsgate F.C. players
English Football League players